Halls Head is a coastal suburb (locality) of Mandurah, immediately west of Mandurah's central area. It is largely residential and contains several canal estates developed since the 1980s.

Geography 
Halls Head is one of four Mandurah suburbs (along with Erskine, Falcon and Wannanup) that lie on an island bound by the Mandurah Estuary to the north, the Peel-Harvey Estuary to the east, the Dawesville Channel to the south and the Indian Ocean to the west. Halls Head is the northernmost and most-populated of the four. The main roads include Mary Street, which links Halls Head directly to Mandurah CBD and Pinjarra Road. The other access road is the Old Coast Road, part of the national Highway 1 which links not only to Mandurah but also Perth and Bunbury. This road also acts as the eastern boundary, with Erskine on the opposite side of the road. Peelwood Parade and McLarty Road form a general north-south arterial through Halls Head, with other major roads including Leighton Road, Casuarina Drive and Seascapes Boulevard.

History 
Halls Head was officially gazetted as a suburb in 1970. It is the location of Hall's Cottage, the single-storey stone house built by the Hall family in 1833 and the only extant early settler's cottage in the district.

Through the twentieth century the area was mostly a beach and fishing resort, with some permanent residents and many vacation homes. The 1000-hectare suburb of Halls Head was developed during the 1980s by the Parry Corporation and the state Government Employees Superannuation Board—one of the notorious WA Inc deals which later gave rise to a royal commission.

Public transport 
Halls Head is serviced by public transport provided by Transperth. Route 591 serves areas in north-western and central Halls Head. 592 operates through Port Mandurah and the western parts of Seascapes (via McLarty Road and Peelwood Parade) while 594 passes to the east of the suburb via Old Coast Road. 591 and 594 operates seven days a week while 592 operates six days a week.

References

Suburbs of Mandurah